Venezuela requires its residents to register their motor vehicles and display vehicle registration plates. 

Current plates are North American standard 6 × 12 inches (152 × 300 mm).

The car registration plates of Venezuela (also called plates) are distinctive used for the identification of all vehicles automotiveis that travel through the national communication channels. The coding system in force since 2008 establishes a serialization consisting of four letters and three numbers. Fees vary according to the type of transport and its specific use.

Format 
Venezuelan license plates have a serialization of four letters and three numbers, for a total of seven characters ('AB123CD). 
The plates have a rectangular shape of 300 mm x 150 mm, framed with black borders and a white background on which an impression of the national flag] has been superimposed. . The alphanumeric serial is located in the center of the plate, whose sequence of digits will correspond to the type of vehicle. The legend Bolivarian Republic of Venezuela is inscribed in the upper part in blue, while the lower part will indicate the federal entity in which it is domiciled the owner of the vehicle. The last letter of the particular serial will indicate that same locality by code.

Identification

According to the federal entity 
The current legal provision establishes that the last letter of the plate indicates the federal entity in which the vehicle was registered. In previous resolutions, this was located in the first letter.

During the 1990s, the use of the letters W, X and Y began to designate the former federal territories that were elevated to the category of state: Delta Amacuro in 1991, Amazonas in 1992 and Vargas in 1998. For its part, the letter Z is used for signalization, but does not designate any entity in particular.

Depending on the type of vehicle 
The license plates between ordinary (private) vehicles and special ones present differences in the ordering of their characters, as well as in their measurements, designs and security devices depending on the use or the organization to which they are assigned.

Ordinary

Specials

Officials

Disputes 
The new Venezuelan license plates in force since 2008 have been strongly criticized by citizens and by security forces because it is difficult to identify a vehicle at the time of any type of accident (theft, homicide, robbery, collision without responsibility, etc.) what makes the old system (1982 -1997) endearing, where the plates had three letters and three numbers, the type of use was identified with colors at the bottom of the plate and at the bottom of the letters, the special plates also they were visibly notable (schoolchildren, taxi, by post and public authorities). It has been determined worldwide that the more numbers and letters the license plate of a vehicle has, the more difficult and tedious the identification system is.

Notes

References

External links 
 Instituto Nacional de Transporte Terrestre — portal web oficial.
 Datos y fotos de matrículas de Venezuela (en español)
 Norma COVENIN 160:2000

Venezuela
Transport in Venezuela
Venezuela transport-related lists